Manmanning is a small Wheatbelt town in Western Australia.

The name of the town first appeared on charts drawn in 1907, and was the Indigenous Australian name of a soak located close to the townsite.

The townsite was originally a railway siding on the Ejanding North line and land was set aside for settlers in 1927. The townsite was gazetted in 1929.

The surrounding areas produce wheat and other cereal crops. The town is a receival site for Cooperative Bulk Handling.

References 

Grain receival points of Western Australia
Shire of Dowerin